The Oberwolfach problem is an unsolved problem in mathematics that may be formulated either as a problem of scheduling seating assignments for diners,
or more abstractly as a problem in graph theory, on the edge cycle covers of complete graphs. It is named after the Oberwolfach Research Institute for Mathematics, where the problem was posed in 1967 by Gerhard Ringel. It is known to be true for all sufficiently-large complete graphs.

Formulation
In conferences held at Oberwolfach, it is the custom for the participants to dine together in a room with circular tables, not all the same size, and with assigned seating that rearranges the participants from meal to meal. The Oberwolfach problem asks how to make a seating chart for a given set of tables so that all tables are full at each meal and all pairs of conference participants are seated next to each other exactly once. An instance of the problem can be denoted as  where  are the given table sizes. Alternatively, when some table sizes are repeated, they may be denoted using exponential notation; for instance,  describes an instance with three tables of size five.

Formulated as a problem in graph theory, the pairs of people sitting next to each other at a single meal can be represented as a disjoint union of cycle graphs  of the specified lengths, with one cycle for each of the dining tables. This union of cycles is a 2-regular graph, and every 2-regular graph has this form.

In order for a solution to exist, the total number of conference participants (or equivalently, the total capacity of the tables, or the total number of vertices of the given cycle graphs) must be an odd number. For, at each meal, each participant sits next to two neighbors, so the total number of neighbors of each participant must be even, and this is only possible when the total number of participants is odd. Like the ménage problem (a different mathematical problem involving seating arrangements of diners and tables), this variant of the problem can be formulated by supposing that the  diners are arranged into  married couples, and that the seating arrangements should place each diner next to each other diner except their own spouse exactly once.

Known results
It is widely believed that all other instances have a solution. 
This conjecture is supported by recent non-constructive and asymptotic solutions for large complete graphs of order greater than a lower bound that is however unquantified.

Cases for which a constructive solution is known include:
All instances in which all of the cycles have even length.

Related problems
Kirkman's schoolgirl problem, of grouping fifteen schoolgirls into rows of three in seven different ways so that each pair of girls appears once in each triple, is a special case of the Oberwolfach problem, . The problem of Hamiltonian decomposition of a complete graph  is another special case, .

Alspach's conjecture, on the decomposition of a complete graph into cycles of given sizes, is related to the Oberwolfach problem, but neither is a special case of the other.

References

Mathematical problems
Unsolved problems in graph theory